Athikkottai  is a village in the Mannargudi taluk of Tiruvarur district in Tamil Nadu, India. 
The main activities of this village is Agriculture.

Demographics 

As per the 2001 census, Athikkottai had a population of 1,110 with 555 males and 555 females. The sex ratio was 1000. The literacy rate was 75.91%.

References 

 

Villages in Tiruvarur district